Feuerbach is a surname. Notable people with the surname include:

Paul Johann Anselm Ritter von Feuerbach (1775–1833), German legal scholar
Joseph Anselm Feuerbach (1798–1851), German philologist and archaeologist
Karl Wilhelm Feuerbach (1800–1834), German mathematician
Ludwig Feuerbach (1804–1872), German philosopher and anthropologist
Friedrich Feuerbach (1806–1880), German philologist and philosopher
Henriette Feuerbach (1812–1892), German writer, wife of Joseph Anselm, and patron of the art of her stepson Anselm 
Anselm Feuerbach (1829–1880), classicist painter
Lawrence Feuerbach (1879–1911), American shot-put Olympian
Al Feuerbach (born 1948), American shot putter

See also
Feuerbach (disambiguation)